Leanna Creel (born August 27, 1970) is an American actress, film producer, film director, screenwriter and photographer.

Biography
Creel is an identical triplet who, along with her sisters, Joy Creel and Monica Lacy, started acting in the late 1980s. They appeared together in two television movies aired on The Wonderful World of Disney: Parent Trap III and Parent Trap: Hawaiian Honeymoon. In 1992, Creel had a guest role in an episode of Beverly Hills, 90210, alongside Monica. That same year, she landed the role of Tori in Saved by the Bell. Following her stint on Saved by the Bell, Creel had guest roles on One West Waikiki and Ned & Stacey.

She attended UCLA and received a bachelor's degree in history, and then a master's degree in film and television.

Creel produced her first film in 1994, helping out a friend whose producer had been involved in a car accident. She also worked for the game Hollywood Stock Exchange (HSX). In 1998 she founded a film production company, Ignite Entertainment, with HSX's Michael Burns as President of Production. Creel now runs Creel Studio, a production company specializing in food, travel and lifestyle content and is a photographer and filmmaker.

Personal life

Creel, who came out as gay, married British studio manager Rinat Greenberg on June 17, 2008, when California legalized same-sex marriages. Creel and Greenberg have two sons.

Filmography

Film

Television

References

External links
Creel Studio official website
 

1970 births
Living people
American child actresses
American film actresses
American lesbian actresses
Film producers from California
American photographers
American television actresses
American women film directors
LGBT film directors
American LGBT screenwriters
LGBT people from California
LGBT film producers
American lesbian writers
Actresses from Los Angeles
Triplets
University of California, Los Angeles alumni
American women screenwriters
Film directors from California
American women photographers
UCLA Film School alumni
American women film producers
Screenwriters from California
21st-century American women writers